Farhan Shafiq (born 5 December 1999) is a Pakistani cricketer. He made his List A debut on 18 January 2021, for Northern, in the 2020–21 Pakistan Cup.

References

External links
 

1999 births
Living people
Pakistani cricketers
Place of birth missing (living people)